Stoke Hammond is a village and also a civil parish situated in the north of the unitary authority area of Buckinghamshire, England, about two and a half miles south of Fenny Stratford (Milton Keynes).

The village was first recorded in the Domesday Book of 1086 as Stoche: a common place name in England denoting an Anglo-Saxon church or place of worship. The suffix Hammond was added later in manorial records though it refers to the family who owned the estate at the time of the Domesday survey. Hamon Brito, son of Mainfelin Brito, was the owner of the manor of Stoke in the 12th century.

The manor later passed into the ownership of the Duke of Norfolk; the family still owned it at the end of the Victorian era. The Disney family, apparently related to the illustrator Walt Disney, was also at one time an influential family in the parish.

The parish church is dedicated to St Luke. There is also a Methodist Chapel, built in 1927.

The A4146 used to pass through the village until the bypass opened on 14 September 2007.

The village is close to the West Coast Railway line, although there is no station in the village. The nearest stations are Bletchley and Leighton Buzzard.

The Grand Union Canal passes close by the village.

It is one of the 53 Thankful Villages which lost no men in the First World War, as first identified by the writer Arthur Mee in the 1930s.

David F. Kessler, the former managing director of The Jewish Chronicle, resided in Stoke Hammond.

References

External links

Villages in Buckinghamshire
Civil parishes in Buckinghamshire